Hasanabad-e Khaleseh (also Romanized as Ḩasanābād-e Khāleşeh; also known as Ḩasanābād) is a village in Ahmadabad-e Mostowfi Rural District of Ahmadabad-e Mostowfi District of Eslamshahr County, Tehran province, Iran. At the 2006 National Census, its population was 2,108 in 542 households. The following census in 2011 counted 4,179 people in 847 households. The latest census in 2016 showed a population of 3,568 people in 817 households; it was the largest village in its rural district.

References 

Eslamshahr County

Populated places in Tehran Province

Populated places in Eslamshahr County